Nur Izzuddin bin Mohd Rumsani (born 11 November 1997) is a Malaysian badminton player. He won the 2022 German Open in the men's doubles event partnered with Goh Sze Fei.

Career 
In 2017, Izzuddin and partner Goh Sze Fei finished up as runner-ups at the Malaysia Masters. They won their first BWF World Tour title at the 2022 German Open. A few days later they entered the finals of the Swiss Open but lost out to rivals Fajar Alfian and Muhammad Rian Ardianto.

Izzuddin and Goh also won a bronze medal at the 2022 Badminton Asia Championships in Manila.

Achievements

Asian Championships 
Men's doubles

BWF World Tour (1 title, 2 runners-up) 
The BWF World Tour, which was announced on 19 March 2017 and implemented in 2018, is a series of elite badminton tournaments sanctioned by the Badminton World Federation (BWF). The BWF World Tours are divided into levels of World Tour Finals, Super 1000, Super 750, Super 500, Super 300, and the BWF Tour Super 100.

Men's doubles

BWF Grand Prix (1 runner-up) 
The BWF Grand Prix had two levels, the Grand Prix and Grand Prix Gold. It was a series of badminton tournaments sanctioned by the Badminton World Federation (BWF) and played between 2007 and 2017.

Men's doubles

  BWF Grand Prix Gold tournament
  BWF Grand Prix tournament

BWF International Challenge/Series (4 titles, 3 runners-up) 
Men's doubles

  BWF International Challenge tournament
  BWF International Series tournament
  BWF Future Series tournament

References

External links 
 

1997 births
Living people
People from Kluang
Malaysian people of Malay descent
Malaysian Muslims
Malaysian male badminton players
Competitors at the 2017 Southeast Asian Games
Southeast Asian Games silver medalists for Malaysia
Southeast Asian Games medalists in badminton
21st-century Malaysian people